The Church of Jesus Christ of Latter-day Saints in Uruguay refers to the Church of Jesus Christ of Latter-day Saints (LDS Church) and its members in Uruguay. The first small branch was established in 1947. Since then, the LDS Church in Uruguay has grown to more than 100,000 members in 134 congregations. Uruguay has more LDS Church members per capita than the United States, as well as more members per capita than any country outside of Oceania and Chile.

History

Montevideo was a stopping point for missionaries traveling to other areas as early as the 1920s. A branch was both formed then closed in 1944.  The first permanent congregation was formed in Montevideo in late 1947. Uruguay's first stake was formed in 1967 in Montevideo.

Stakes and Districts
As of February 2023, Uruguay had the following stakes and districts:
Artigas Uruguay Stake
Colonia Uruguay District
De La Costa Uruguay Stake
Durazno Uruguay Stake
Florida Uruguay District
Las Piedras Uruguay Stake
Maldonado Uruguay Stake
Melo Uruguay Stake
Mercedes Uruguay Stake
Montevideo Uruguay Cerro Stake
Montevideo Uruguay East Stake
Montevideo Uruguay Flores Stake
Montevideo Uruguay Maroñas Stake
Montevideo Uruguay North Stake
Montevideo Uruguay West Stake
Paysandu Uruguay Stake
Rivera Uruguay Stake
Salto Uruguay Stake
Tacuarembó Uruguay Stake
Treinta y Tres Uruguay Stake

Missions

Temples

See also

Religion in Uruguay

References

External links
 LDS Newsroom - Uruguay
 The Church of Jesus Christ of Latter-day Saints (Uruguay) - Official Site
 ComeUntoChrist.org Latter-day Saints Visitor site